

Abel

Abra Kadabra (character)

Abby Holland

Ace the Bat-Hound

Acrata
Acrata (Andrea Rojas) is a superheroine appearing in American comic books published by DC Comics who was created as part of the Planet DC annuals event. She first appeared in Superman (vol. 2) Annual #12 (August 2000), and was created by Oscar Pinto, Giovanni Barberi, and F.G. Haghenbeck.

Andrea's father was Bernardo Rojas, once a renowned leader in Central America who researched for "Prehispanic Cultures" at the Universidad Autonoma Metropolitana de Mexico. She lived alone with her cat named Zapata, named after one of the revolutionary leaders of Mexico.

Acrata specialized in striking against organized crime. Every time she caught a perpetrator or helped avert a tragedy, she cited a literary quotation or, if she had the time, painted graffiti insulting or challenging the local authorities, which might hint at her being an anarchist.

Acrata has the power to teleport in shadows, which is derived from an ancient Mayan symbol representing shadows in the night. She is also a talented hand-to-hand fighter whose skill levels have not been revealed yet.

Acrata in other media
 Andrea Rojas appears in the Smallville episode "Vengeance", portrayed by Denise Quiñones. The daughter of an anti-gang activist, Andrea Rojas and her mother were attacked by gangsters one night. Andrea's mother was killed, while Andrea was stabbed in the heart, but survived thanks to a heart transplant, which also gave her superhuman strength due to the heart being irradiated with Kryptonite radiation. After her recovery, Andrea donned a suit and began fighting crime around Suicide Slum, hoping to find the gang member who killed her mother. She also began as an intern at the Daily Planet, to gain information for her activities as a vigilante, later coined in her tie-in "The Vengeance Chronicles" as "Angel of Vengeance".
 Acrata appeared in seasons five and six of the Arrowverse series Supergirl, portrayed by Julie Gonzalo as an adult and by Alexa Najera as a teenager. This version is a polished businesswoman and CEO of Obsidian Tech making a hostile advance into the world of media while moonlighting as a shadow-based vigilante after exposure with Leviathan's leader Gamemnae.
 Acrata appears in the Superman children's novel The Shadow Masters by Paul Kupperberg and published by Capstone Publishers.

Acid Master
Acid Master is a fictional character appearing in American comic books published by DC Comics.

Philip Master is a chemist and saboteur who allied with forces behind the Iron Curtain.

Acid Master in other media
Acid Master appears in The Flash episode "Failure is an Orphan", portrayed by John Gillich. This version is an acid-generating metahuman. He fought Killer Frost before being sent to the S.T.A.R. Labs pipeline so that an older Grace as Cicada II couldn't kill him.

Adam Strange

Aerie
The Aerie, is a fictional character, a terrorist in the DC Comics universe. They are gender non-binary. They first appeared in Suicide Squad (vol. 6) #1 (February 2020). They were created by Tom Taylor and Bruno Redondo.

Agamemno
Agamemno is a supervillain appearing in American comic books published by DC Comics. He first appeared in Silver Age #1 (July 2000) during the Silver Age event (a series of Silver Age styled one-shots of which he was the chief antagonist). He was created by Mark Waid.

Agent Liberty

Air Wave

Michael Akins
Michael Akins is a character in DC Comics.

Michael Akins is a member of the Gateway City Police Department. In his earlier days, Akins had a traumatic experience with Watchdog where the vigilante and the kidnap victim ended up dead. When he moved to Gotham City, he became a trusted police officer working under James Gordon during the "No Man's Land" crisis. When Gordon was shot, Akins became the new police commissioner.

At the time when The Body attacked Gotham City, Commissioner Akins was instructed by Mayor Greeves to light the Bat-Signal. When The Body was defeated, Batman asked Akins to leave the Bat-Signal on and check for any imposters in his ranks. Since then, the relationship between Batman and Akins was tense.

During the "Batman: War Games" storyline, a huge gang war occurred in Gotham City as Batman asked Commissioner Akins for control over the police department. Akins turned him down. Upon Batman taking action with some police officers getting killed, Akins felt that Batman wasn't on the side of the GCPD anymore.

Upon the press demanding the GCPD to take action, Commissioner Akins sent the entire police department to go after Las Arañas led by Tartantula. When Batman tried to get Commissioner Akins to call back the entire police officers, Akins states that he will no longer listen to him. He even had the Bat-Signal removed from the roof.

In 2016, DC Comics implemented another relaunch of its books called "DC Rebirth" which restored its continuity to a form much as it was pritor to "The New 52". Michael Akins is shown to be the Mayor of Gotham City where he is asked about the increased members of the Bat-Family on the news. He states that Batman has been invaluable over the years and that Gotham City doesn't need a second police force. When later visited by Batman, Mayor Akins mentioned about Batman militarizing his group which he worries about, the alliance with Clayface, and the use of teen vigilantes. Batman couldn't answer the question and even commented about how Mayor Akins had selected Hamilton Hill Jr. as his deputy mayor. Not bothered by the allegation of having the deputy mayor being the son of Hamilton Hill, Mayor Akins asked the question "Where does this end"?

Akins was later replaced by a man named Atkins.

Michael Akins in other media
Michael Akins appears in Batwoman, portrayed by Chris Shields. He is shown to be the Mayor of Gotham City. In season two during the riots instigated by Black Mask, Mayor Akins was wounded in his van and Sophie Moore stays by his side until the paramedics arrive. In season three, Mayor Akins is succeeded by Mayor Hartley (portrayed by Sharon Taylor).

Alias the Spider

All-Star

All-Star (Olivia Dawson) is a superheroine appearing in American comic books published by DC Comics. She is a young girl with an alien Star Charm who became a reserve member for the Justice League.

Henry Allen

Henry Allen is the father of Barry Allen/Flash and Malcolm Thawne and the husband of Nora Allen. Initially depicted as an obscure character, he was featured in a storyline in which his body was possessed by the Top's spirit. His character's story changed in The Flash: Rebirth due to Professor Zoom the Reverse-Flash's time-traveling actions. When Barry was a child, Henry was convicted of Nora's murder after being framed by Zoom. This incident drove his son to become obsessive in finding the real killer in hope of freeing Henry. Henry died in prison a year or two before Barry became the Flash, but Henry's name is posthumously cleared by his son in The Flash: Rebirth storyline.

In September 2011, The New 52 rebooted DC's continuity. In this new timeline, Henry's problem of Zoom's framing remains intact. He is still alive and is later freed after the Flash proves his father's innocence after catching Zoom.

Henry Allen in other media
 Henry Allen appeared in the 1990s television series, portrayed by M. Emmet Walsh. 
 Henry Allen appears in the 2014 television series, portrayed by John Wesley Shipp. A respectable doctor, Henry is Barry Allen's father and Nora Allen's husband. He was wrongfully convicted of Nora's murder then incarcerated in Iron Heights after the Reverse-Flash framed him, and only his son and later Joe West believed in his innocence. Learning that Barry is the Flash, Henry serves as his son's moral conscience in using these powers wisely and not being tempted from personal gains. After being released from prison due to Eobard Thawne's confession to Nora's murder, Henry seeks a reclusive life yet occasionally returns later to counsel Barry to offer encouragement during his son's disastrous confrontations with Hunter Zolomon before Henry himself is killed by Zoom to enrage Barry. Henry is also the Earth-1 doppelganger of Jay Garrick/Flash of Earth-3 and Barry Allen/Flash of Earth-90. 
 Henry Allen appears in the 2017 film Justice League, portrayed by Billy Crudup.
 Henry Allen will appear in the 2023 film The Flash, portrayed by Ron Livingston due to Billy Crudup being unavailable during filming.

Nora Allen

Nora Allen is the mother of Barry Allen and Malcolm Thawne and the wife of Henry Allen. She was initially depicted as an obscure character, but her character's story changed in The Flash: Rebirth. When Professor Zoom the Reverse-Flash decided to get revenge on the Flash, Nora is murdered to mess with Barry's childhood and Henry was convicted due to lack of evidence. Barry could never believe that Henry killed Nora and this led her son to become the Flash.

Nora Allen in other media
 Nora Allen was portrayed by Priscilla Pointer in the 1990 TV series The Flash.
 Nora Allen appears in the 2013 animated movie Justice League: The Flashpoint Paradox, voiced by Grey Griffin. 
 Nora Allen appears in the live-action 2014 television series, portrayed by Michelle Harrison. Similar to her modern depiction, Nora was Barry Allen's mother and Henry Allen's wife. She was in the middle of the Reverse-Flash's attempt to try to kill the young Barry during a fight with the Flash (the young Barry's future self). Nora ends up becoming the Reverse-Flash's target instead after the Flash takes the young Barry to safety, figuring that such a tragedy would prevent Barry from becoming the Flash, with Henry being framed for her murder. The Speed Force would occasionally use Nora's likeness to help Barry to come to terms with her death.
 Nora Allen will appear in the DC Extended Universe film The Flash, portrayed by Maribel Verdú.

Harold Allnut

Harold Allnut is a fictional comic book character appearing in stories published by DC Comics, in particular those featuring Batman. He is a mute and kyphotic man who serves as a trusted mechanic and aide to Batman, helping to design, build, and repair that superhero's equipment. Created by writers Dennis O'Neil and Alan Grant, the character first appeared in The Question #33 (December 1989).

Harold is a mute hunchbacked man who is expelled from his house in Gotham City and subsequently travels to Hub City. Initially his full name is not revealed and he goes only by 'Harold'. His first appearance in a Batman comic occurs the first part of the story arc "Penguin Affair". Harold is initially cast as a henchman for the Penguin, who had conned Harold to work for him and build deadly machines with which he could threaten Gotham City. Months after putting an end to Penguin's scheme, Batman finds Harold in an abandoned building and saves him from a mob of angry parents who have mistaken him for a child molester due to his appearance.

After rescuing Harold, Batman gives him a home and a position in the Batcave, working as a technological aide in his war on crime. A diary entry in 'The Batman Files' explains Alfred's first encounter with Harold. The newcomer is delighted to have advanced technology to work with while Alfred has doubts. Batman explains Harold's poor living conditions and Alfred is pleased at Harold's rescue. Harold's assistance continues even after Bruce Wayne is disabled while fighting the villain Bane in the Knightfall storyline. Harold builds a unique wheelchair for Wayne, which includes multiple surprises such as emergency shelter. During the story arc Knightsaga, the new Batman, Jean-Paul Valley, ejects Harold, along with Ace the Bat-Hound and Robin, from the main Batcave. Harold and Ace manage to sneak into a hidden subsection of the cave where Harold continues to work, eventually aiding Nightwing, Robin, and Bruce Wayne to retake the cave from Valley. Harold resumes his position as Batman's technological aide and also designs a new costume for Nightwing. He worked with Azrael (Jean-Paul Valley) by request of Batman for a time before the death of the former. During this time he lived in Azrael's new home, a converted castle.

In the storyline Hush, Harold had been tricked by the title character into undergoing surgery to repair his voice and his stature. In exchange, Harold was made to place a hidden circuitry relay onto the Batcave's main computer which gave off subliminal signals which affected Batman's mind. Harold attempts to reveal Hush's identity to Batman, but Hush prevents this by shooting him fatally. In his final words, Harold states "I knew that even if I had been tricked...you [Batman] are my hero. You would always win." Batman responds that he can forgive Harold's betrayal. He understands how powerful the desire to be happy can be. Harold is then buried in a grave on a hill overlooking Wayne Manor. Harold's last name Allnut is revealed by Batman who 'did some digging' and his full name is engraved onto his tombstone.

In DC Rebirth, a version of Harold Allnut appears. Following Batman and Harvey Dent's close encounter with KGBeast, Duke Thomas takes them to a farm where Harold performs surgery on Two-Face. Batman explains to Duke that Harold creates equipment for him and ships it to Gotham. Harold's caption describes him as "Genius Inventor, Mute, Family."

Alpha Centurion
Alpha Centurion is the name of three fictional superheroes published by DC Comics. Created by Karl Kesel, the character first appeared in Zero Hour: Crisis in Time #3 (September 1994).

Marcus Aelius

Alpha Centurion A
During the Zero Hour storyline, Superman was transported to an alternate timeline where he stumbled upon a Metropolis whose hero was the Alpha Centurion, a man named Marcus Aelius from Ancient Rome who had been trained by an alien race called the Virimiru only to return centuries later. Initially joining the gathered heroes, the Alpha Centurion went on to join Extant and Parallax in fighting against the heroes of the DC Universe, siding with Parallax as he promised to restore Alpha Centurion's apparently lost timeline. After the heroes had to restart existence with a new Big Bang, all alternate realities ceased to exist and this Alpha Centurion was no more.

Alpha Centurion B
Some time later, the Alpha Centurion of our timeline showed up. He too was Marcus Aelius and, like his counterpart before him, began operating out of Metropolis. He initially had some tension with Superman. With Lex Luthor in hiding and the Contessa Erica del Portenza in charge of Lexcorp, AC was put in charge of Team Luthor, which was remodeled after himself. When Superman was put on trial in front of an alien tribunal, he recruited Superboy, Supergirl, the Eradicator, and Steel to rescue him. He had a brief falling out with the others, since they mistakenly believed for a time that he was the Cyborg Superman in disguise. After arriving back on Earth, he was publicly embarrassed by Lex Luthor, quit Team Luthor and left Metropolis. He aided Earth's heroes in attempting to stop the Sun-Eater from consuming the Sun during the Final Night cross-over event. He was last seen in Washington D.C.

Aelius' origin was expanded upon. The Virmiru would visit worlds and exchange a champion of the world with one of their own, with the ultimate goal of conquering that world. The exchange was to appear as an act of friendship while the alien that remained would gain trust and ascertain weaknesses. After the champion is returned, the planet would be deemed ripe for conquest. Aelius celebrated a victory he led for the Roman legion under Emperor Hadrian when the Virmiru appeared on Earth. They proposed their offer and a global contest was held until Aelius emerged as Earth's greatest warrior. He would go to the Virmiru homeworld where he trained beside many other alien races in many fields including using the power suit employed by their hosts. All the while, the Virmiru Foris Ab Talimen remained on Earth for 2,000 years awaiting the return of Aelius (though, only ten years would pass for the champion). When his training was completed, the Virmiru gave Aelius the space ship Pax Romana he would use to return to his planet. After some time acting as a superhero in Washington, the Virmiru Interstellar Affairs Councilor Bellator contacted Aelius and told him Foris had gone rogue. When confronted, Foris told Alpha Centurion the truth about his race and the pair went to battle Bellator. Though perishing in the battle, Bellator admitted the Virmiru's objectives and revealed the invasion forthcoming.

Roman
A new Alpha Centurion was introduced in the Doomed series. During a terrorist attack at a museum, a college student named Roman used a belt from an exhibit as a tourniquet for his leg after he was shot. This allowed an ancient god, the Alpha Centurion, to take over his body and defeat the terrorists. Afterwards, the Alpha Centurion would continue to take over Roman's body at different times, acting as a superhero in Metropolis, though Roman is scared that one day the Centurion won't give him his body back when he's done with it. Roman is also roommates and friends with another student named Reiser, who transforms into a Doomsday-infected monster that comes into conflict with the Centurion.

Marcus was a normal human who had been taken by aliens into space. He was granted access to incredible knowledge and advanced technology. In addition to his spacecraft the Pax Romana, Marcus' advanced suit of alien armor allows him to fly, grants him superhuman strength and speed, and allows him to generate an energy blade, similar to a lightsaber, and an energy shield.

Alura

Amazo

Ambush Bug

Amazing-Man

Amethyst, Princess of Gemworld

Amygdala

Anarky

Andrew Bennett

Andromeda

Angle Man
The Angle Man was an unsuccessful criminal who became obsessed with crimes with unbeatable "angles". He plagued Wonder Woman with a series of increasingly clever schemes involving "angles".

The Angle Man was created by Robert Kanigher and Harry G. Peter and first appeared in Wonder Woman #70 (November 1954)

He reappeared, now wearing a yellow and green costume and wielding the Angler, a Penrose triangle which could warp time and space in a variety of ways. A text page in that issue explained that he had been recruited and outfitted by the Secret Society of Super Villains's founder Darkseid only to use the Angler to warp ahead in time to a point after Darkseid had been exposed and deposed as the Society's secret leader. He also began appearing in the Wonder Woman title once more. At one point, he fights Wonder Woman's friend Etta Candy.

This Angle Man died in the 1985 12-issue maxiseries Crisis on Infinite Earths, apparently as a result of attempting to use his Angler during the massive dimensional upheavals caused by that event.

After the events of Crisis on Infinite Earths, the entire DC Universe history was erased and restarted again with the same familiar characters, but with all-new backgrounds and histories. In the Angle Man's case, a still-living un-costumed Angle Man initially appeared briefly in the Flash comic book series as one of several villains whose equipment was appropriated by the weapon-absorbing Replicant.

Later, during Phil Jimenez's run on the Wonder Woman title, he was revamped into Angelo Bend, an Italian master gentleman thief for hire who uses his special Angler to escape authorities. He was caught by Donna Troy while trying to steal an ancient artifact from a museum. Even though Donna, as Troia, was trying to stop the villain, the Angle Man formed a bit of a crush on the Amazon. He became so enamored with her that he instinctively transported himself to Themyscira, seeking Donna's help when he was savagely attacked by a Fury-possessed Barbara Ann Minerva. Later it was learned that he had been hired by Barbara, the previous Cheetah, who had lost her powers to Sebastian Ballesteros and needed the stolen artifacts to regain them. He was also seen grieving at Donna Troy's funeral after she was briefly killed by a Superman robot.

The next time he was shown was among a large team of supervillains formed by the Wonder Woman villain Devastation. An enemy of Cassie Sandsmark, Devastation formed the group to battle the now-disbanded Young Justice.

The sophisticated thief re-imagined by Jimenez was subsequently written as an entirely different personality, much deadlier and obsessive.

Bend appeared during the Infinite Crisis storyline as a member of the Secret Society of Super Villains who were operating in the East End of Gotham City. Catwoman infiltrated the team, pretending to be a villain again to get close to the Society. Bend discovered her discussing her plan to double-cross the Society and attacked her, shooting her in the stomach and stabbing her in the head with a triangle-shaped blade. However, the Catwoman the Angle Man "killed" was, in fact, a new Clayface whom Catwoman had recently encountered and asked for help. The real Catwoman appeared and, during her attack on the villains, beat Bend savagely with a baseball bat.

One Year Later, Selina Kyle has given up her identity as Catwoman after having a child. Her associate and friend Holly Robinson has taken over the identity of Catwoman. Bend, now obsessed with Catwoman and bent on revenge, has targeted Holly, not realizing that he is going after the wrong person. He has since been defeated by Holly once (the brutal fight was caught on tape), but has been approached by a new villain calling himself the Film Freak, apparently a successor to the deceased Batman villain of the same name. When the Film Freak deduces Selina's secret identity, the two villains launch an attack on her apartment. In the wake of this, he even threatens to kill Selina's baby and to give her secret identity away to other supervillains. These plans are, however, thwarted when Selina calls in Zatanna, who performs another mindwipe on the two men. This results in the Angle Man forcibly confessing his crimes to the Gotham police after reminiscing about his more glorious days as a supervillain.

Angelo next appears as an ally of Circe who has amassed a large team of villains to attack Wonder Woman. He informs Diana that Circe has amplified his powers and uses his Angler to replicate itself as a projectile stabbing tool. He and his teammates are about to subdue Wonder Woman when she is rescued by a large group of the Amazon's allies. The Angle Man is rendered unconscious by Robin in hand-to-hand combat and is then arrested under the authority of the Department of Metahuman Affairs. After the Angle Man's incarceration has been processed, his Anglers are taken by Nemesis and placed in government confiscation.

In 2011, The New 52 rebooted the DC universe. The Angle Man is first seen in a bar witnessing the news of Superman and Wonder Woman's romantic coupling. He also participated in a meeting of several supervillains during the Forever Evil storyline. Most recently, the Angle Man was revealed to be Vandal Savage's son. After a failed plot against Superman and Wonder Woman, the Angle Man was imprisoned and later killed by his father for insubordination.

After the events of DC Rebirth, the Angle Man was mentioned by Wonder Woman as she discussed battling a new foe called the Anglette, who also wielded the Angler weapon. The Angle Man later resurfaced in Zandia, a political haven for costumed supervillains.

Angle Man in other media
 Angle Man makes primarily non-speaking appearances in Justice League Unlimited, voiced by an uncredited Phil LaMarr in the episode "The Great Brain Robbery". This version is a minor member of Gorilla Grodd's Secret Society. Prior to and during the episodes "Alive!" and "Destroyer", Lex Luthor takes command of the Society, but Grodd mounts a mutiny. Angle Man sides with the latter before being killed by Darkseid alongside most of the Society.
 Angle Man makes a cameo appearance in the Batman: The Brave and the Bold episode "Joker: The Vile and the Villainous!".
 Angle Man appears as an assist character in Scribblenauts Unmasked: A DC Comics Adventure.
 Angle Man appears in issue #28 of the Super Friends tie-in comic book.
 Angle Man appears in All-New Batman: The Brave and the Bold #4.
 Angle Man makes a cameo appearance in Wonder Woman '77 #4.

Anima
Anima (Courtney Mason) is a superheroine appearing in American comic books published by DC Comics, who starred in the comic book series of the same name. The character was created and written by science fiction and fantasy authors Elizabeth Hand and Paul Witcover.

Rebellious teenage runaway Courtney Mason acquired her miraculous powers following an attack by parasitic aliens: one of many New Blood superbeings created in this way, as part of the Bloodlines crossover. Seven extraterrestrial predators had come to Earth and slaughtered thousands of humans by feeding on their spinal fluids. On the run in New Orleans, Courtney was kidnapped by a cult that sacrificed her to two of these insatiable parasites, known as Pritor and Lissik, but Courtney did not die. Instead, the parasites' bites unleashed the Animus, a sentient-energy creature that can absorb the spirit essences of the living and the dead, which was now able to enter the world through Courtney. She became the embodiment of mankind's rage and masculine drive, and quickly developed physical powers of her own. As Anima, Courtney sought revenge against the cult. She also met the Teen Titans and battled a variety of supernatural menaces. Anima remains a wanderer, traveling from place to place and helping those in need by calling upon the fearsome primal force inside her.

Anima featured prominently in DC Comics' Bloodbath limited series (1993), in which all the New Blood characters teamed up to help defeat the alien parasites who had empowered them. The following year she showed up in the Zero Hour crossover.

Anima's own title, beginning in December 1993, ran for 16 months before being cancelled due to low sales (issues numbered #1-15, plus a #0 issue between #7 & #8 in line with Zero Hour). It was an unconventional DC comic book, with the main theme being a war between metaphysical beings who embodied the Jungian archetypes of human psychology - Animus was only one of these. The series had a huge supporting cast, both human and supernatural - in some issues, Anima herself appeared for only a few pages. Courtney's younger brother Jeremy Mason becomes the channel for Animus' evil sister, Eris (Eris shares her name with a goddess of Greek Mythology, who herself appeared in DC's Wonder Woman title, second series). Animus and Eris ultimately combine as the Syzygy, to fight their father/enemy known only as The Nameless One. The series featured innumerable pop-culture references, as symbols of the collective unconscious where the archetypal beings dwell. Fellow DC superheroes Superboy and Hawkman also guest-starred - with Superboy temporarily acting as a channel for an archetype called The Warrior.

Since the demise of her title, Anima has appeared very infrequently. She appeared in the Young Justice series, the final issue of Infinite Crisis, and again in the more recent Titans East Special as a potential member of Cyborg's new group. She was badly wounded along with the rest of the team at the conclusion of the special and was left in a coma along with Lagoon Boy and Vulcan.

She came out of her coma sometime later and appeared in Faces of Evil: Prometheus one-shot in January 2009. She is part of a new Blood Pack alongside Gunfire, Hook and Argus. They were pursuing the second villain to take up the Prometheus alias when the original one, awakened from his own coma, came to take his revenge on the usurper. The original Prometheus quickly crippled Gunfire, and as Anima charged him, he teleported. The effect of the teleport cut Anima in half, killing her and leaving her legs on the streets of Gotham, and the rest of her in Prometheus' Ghost Zone.

At first Anima gained her power by artificially aging nearby people. After an encounter with Navaho Indians in issue #5, she was able to draw power directly from the spirit world without harming anyone.

Animal Man

Animal-Vegetable-Mineral Man

Anti-Fate
Anti-Fate (Dr. Benjamin Stoner) is a former psychiatrist who became an enemy of Doctor Fate after being possessed by Typhon of the Lords of Chaos. Before he was corrupted by Typhon, Benjamin Stoner was a chief psychiatrist at Arkham Asylum in Gotham City. After an encounter with Doctor Fate, Stoner was freed from the influence of the Lords of Order and Chaos and became a person.

The character was created by J.M. DeMatteis and Keith Giffen, first appearing in Doctor Fate #1 (July 1987).

The Anti-Fate in other media
Dr. Benjamin Stoner appeared in the 2019 film Joker, portrayed by Frank Wood. This version is Penny Fleck's therapist at Arkham State Hospital.

Anti-Monitor

Antiope

Anton Arcane

Anthro

Apache Chief

Apparition

Aquagirl

Aqualad

Aquaman

Arak

Archer
Archer is a fictional character appearing in American comic books published by DC Comics.

Fenton Quigley
Fenton Quigley was born into a life of wealth. He wanted to be a big game hunter, but an argument with his father left him cut off from the family fortune. Fenton was left with a taste of the high life with no way to pay for it. At this point, Fenton decided to put his big game skills to the test. Because his specialty was killing with a bow and arrow, Fenton chose the simple but effective sobriquet of the Archer to mask his doings from the law as he makes use of some trick arrows. Foolishly though, he allowed his egotism to rule him enough so that he made sure the police knew that this new string of killings was the work of one man. It was not long before the Archer was Public Enemy #1. The Archer ended up having an encounter with Superman who defeated him. The Archer was arrested by the police, convicted on several accounts of murder, and given a stiff prison sentence.

Some years later, the Archer escaped from prison with a new arsenal of tricks. He attempted to get revenge on Superman which failed and the Archer was returned to prison.

Archer II
In 2011, "The New 52" rebooted the DC universe. Archer wears a hoodie and a green mask. During the "Forever Evil" storyline, Archer found the Rogues when they were fleeing from the Crime Syndicate of America and shot Trickster in the foot with one of his arrows. While planning to make a name of himself and turn the Rogues over to the Crime Syndicate for a reward, Archer was knocked unconscious by them. Archer was among the villains that accompanied Gorilla Grodd in attacking the Rogues upon being dispatched by Grid.

Archer in other media
 A completely different character using the name Archer appeared in two episodes of the Batman television series. He appeared in "Shoot a Crooked Arrow" and "Walk the Straight and Narrow" played by Art Carney. However, company records state that this Archer was created specifically for the series by writer Stanley Ralph Ross.
 The Archer from the 1960s Batman TV series appears in the Batman: The Brave and the Bold episode "Day of the Dark Knight!". He is seen among the inmates trying to escape from Iron Heights Penitentiary only to be stopped by Batman and Green Arrow.
 In Justice League: Crisis on Two Earths, the Archer is the name of the Crime Syndicate version of Green Arrow, voiced by Jim Meskimen.

Ares

Argus

Argus is a superhero appearing an American comic books published by DC Comics. He first appeared during the Bloodlines crossover event in The Flash (vol. 2) Annual #6 (1993), and was created by Mark Waid and Phil Hester. While investigating one of Keystone City's criminal organisations using the alias "Nick Kovac", federal agent Nick Kelly was attacked by a Bloodlines Parasite named Venev. Kelly gained the ability to become totally invisible in shadow and to see far beyond the normal spectrum in microwaves and infrared.

He later works with the Flash when Central City is attacked by weapons satellites. He would go on to work with the Blood Pack, a team of superheroes formed out of the survivors of the alien attacks.

During the Infinite Crisis, a worldwide supervillain breakout occurs, part of a long-term plan. Argus, working alongside other heroes such as Vixen, does his part by subduing the Mad Hatter.

In JSA Classified #19 (January 2007), Argus is revealed to be a patient in a S.T.A.R. Labs facility, left blind and powerless after having his eyes removed.  The culprit is initially identified by Doctor Mid-Nite as a resurfaced Ultra-Humanite, but it later turns out to have been done at the behest of the long-thought-dead actress Delores Winters, now calling herself Endless Winter. Part two of "Skin Trade" (JSA Classified #20) has Doctor Mid-Nite retrieving Argus' eyes from an actor named Billy, seemingly leaving him blind. The eyes are returned as the wounded hero awaits re-attachment surgery. Dr. Mid-Nite believes that Argus's healing factor (which previously allowed him to grow new eyes) will help Argus make a full recovery.

Argus appears in Faces of Evil: Prometheus #1 and fights the titular villain. He is shown to be the leader of a new version of the Blood Pack. This team includes Hook, Anima and Gunfire. Hook and Anima are killed by two different claimants to the name Prometheus. The real one chops off Gunfire's hands.

After being bitten by the Bloodlines Parasite, Argus' body underwent a mutagenic process that endowed him with several superpowers. He can become invisible in shadows, and can see beyond the visible light spectrum into the infrared and ultraviolet. Argus' strength level and reflexes have been increased beyond those of a normal human being. Argus also has a rapid healing factor, to the point where he was able to regrow his eyes when they were gouged out.

Argent

Arion

Amadeus Arkham
Amadeus Arkham is a character in DC Comics. He was the founder of Arkham Asylum and is the uncle of Jeremiah Arkham.

He was created in 1984 for the entry for Arkham Asylum in Who's Who: The Definitive Directory of the DC Universe #1. The story was retold and expanded in 1989 in Arkham Asylum: A Serious House on Serious Earth. The graphic novel is interspersed with flashbacks to Arkham founder Amadeus Arkham's life and childhood. The character recently appeared in DC's The New 52 as a protagonist of All Star Western alongside Jonah Hex.

The Who's Who entry establishes that the Asylum was named after Elizabeth Arkham, the mother of founder Amadeus Arkham. The original name of the asylum was Arkham Hospital. Its dark history began in the early 1900s when Arkham's mother, having suffered from mental illness most of her life, committed suicide (it was later revealed that her son actually euthanized her and repressed the memory). Amadeus Arkham decided, then, as the sole heir to the Arkham estate, to remodel his family home and properly treat the mentally ill. Prior to the period of the hospital's remodeling, Arkham treated patients at the State Psychiatric Hospital in Metropolis, where he, his wife Constance and daughter Harriet had been living for quite some time.

Upon telling his family of his plans, they moved back to his family home to oversee the remodeling. While there, Arkham received a call from the police notifying him that serial killer Martin "Mad Dog" Hawkins — referred to Arkham by Metropolis Penitentiary while at State Psychiatric Hospital — had escaped from prison, and sought his considered opinion on the murderer's state of mind. Shortly afterward, Arkham returned to his home to find his front door wide open. Inside, he discovered the mutilated bodies of his wife and daughter in an upstairs room with Hawkins' nickname carved on Harriet's body.

The shock of the murders brings back the memory of killing his mother. For many years, Elizabeth suffered delusions that she was being tormented by a supernatural creature and would call to her son to protect her. One day, however, he finally sees what his mother saw - a great bat, a spectre of death. Taking a pearl-handled straight razor from his pocket, he cuts his mother's throat to end her suffering. He then blocks out the memory and attributes her death to suicide.

Traumatized, Amadeus puts on his mother's wedding dress and takes out the pearl-handled razor. It is vaguely implied that Arkham cannibalizes his family's remains in a shamanic ritual. Kneeling in the blood of his family, he vows to bind the evil spirit of "The Bat", which he believes inhabits the house, through ritual and sorcery. He treats Hawkins for months until finally electrocuting him in a shock therapy session. This incident is treated as an accident by the authorities. Soon after, Arkham freefalls into madness. He continues his mission even after he is incarcerated in the Asylum himself after trying to kill his stockbroker in 1929; he scratches the words of a binding spell into the walls and floor of his cell with his fingernails and constantly belts out "The Star-Spangled Banner" in a loud voice until the day he dies.
 
Decades later Dr. Cavendish, another doctor in the asylum, believes he is a reincarnation of Amadeus and frees the inmates. Towards the end of the story, he takes another doctor, Dr. Adams, hostage, dresses himself in the dress of Amadeus' mother and relates Arkham's history to Batman before attempting to strangle him. Dr. Adams saves Batman by killing Cavendish with the same razor Amadeus used to kill his mother.

Amadeus' role in creating the asylum, Hawkins' history with Amadeus and Amadeus' descent into madness have become canon and are the origin of Arkham Asylum in all incarnations of the asylum since.

In The New 52 reboot, Amadeus Arkham is re-established as having been the partner of the bounty hunter Jonah Hex. Amadeus is a psychologist who specializes in criminal behavior and lives in a mansion with his mother. Amadeus often partners up with Jonah Hex in an effort to solve a series of murders that were committed by the Gotham Ripper and even uncovered a child slavery operation run by Thurston Moody of the Court of Owls.

Amadeus Arkham in other media
 The spirit of Dr. Amadeus Arkham appears in the video game Batman: Arkham Asylum, voiced by Tom Kane. The spirit of Arkham is unlocked by scanning several tablets scattered around Arkham, supposedly by Amadeus himself. They retell the story of Amadeus euthanizing his mother, the death of wife and daughter by Mad Dog, Mad Dog's death at the hands of Arkham's guards and finally Amadeus' descent into madness. It is hinted (and later confirmed) that Warden Quincy Sharp, who believes that he is Amadeus reincarnated, is responsible for the messages as evidenced by his attempts to kill Poison Ivy, Killer Croc, Joker and Harley Quinn being recorded onto the tablets. While there is no knowledge as to how he attempted to kill them, Sharp mentions his plans to lobotomize Harley and attempt to kill Joker in his sleep, which is thwarted by the Scarecrow. If Batman scans all the tablets and comes back to the security office where he left Quincy Sharp, he will find in his place a final message telling Batman to continue his work. Amadeus' cell can also be found in the game, the entirety of its walls and floor covered with binding circles as in Arkham Asylum: A Serious House on Serious Earth.
 In the video game Batman: Arkham City, it is revealed that Sharp's delusions of being Arkham's reincarnation were the result of drugs and hypnotherapy delivered by Dr. Hugo Strange with the help of Mad Hatter. Scanning items related to certain inmates reveal that Sharp had treated the inmates abusively, notably by locking Mad Hatter in the physically lowest cell in the Asylum with the clear intent of him never getting out (whether he meant to kill him is unclear) and again trying to murder Poison Ivy by locking her in a cell and letting her die of her Titan overdose caused by the Joker, only for a priest covered in pollen to give Ivy the needed ingredients from the pollen to heal herself. Listening to the Blackgate inmates shows that some of them are aware of Sharp's inhumane treatments towards his patients (having occasionally been victims themselves), as well as Sharp often murdering his patients.
 A statue of Amadeus Arkham can be seen outside on the Arkham Asylum stage in the 2017 fighting game Injustice 2.
 Like most other incarnations, Amadeus Arkham is the founder of Arkham Asylum in the DC Extended Universe. He was first mentioned in Time Out Shortlist Gotham and Metropolis, a two-part fictional guide to the cities of Gotham City and Metropolis released by Time Out Group, Turkish Airlines, and Warner Bros. as a tie-in for the 2016 film Batman v Superman: Dawn of Justice.

Jeremiah Arkham

Arm-Fall-Off-Boy

Arm-Fall-Off-Boy (Floyd Belkin) is a superhero from the 30th century, appearing in American comic books published by DC Comics. His first appearance was in Secret Origins #46 (December 1989). He was created by writer Gerard Jones and artist Curt Swan, who based him on a fan parody character. After the 1994 "Zero Hour" storyline, the character of Arm-Fall-Off-Boy was briefly reintroduced as Splitter.

Arm-Fall-Off-Boy has the ability to detach his own limbs, which he can then use as weapons. His background is not explored in his initial appearances; in Legionnaires #12, Matter-Eater Lad claims he gained his powers through carelessness while holding the anti-gravity metal Element 152, but Matter-Eater Lad may not have been serious. In his introduction, he is an applicant at the first Legion tryout, and the first Legion reject.

Following the "Zero Hour" reboot, the character appears again in Legionnaires #43 and is identified as Floyd Belkin of the planet Lallor. Under the name Splitter, Floyd participates in the Legion's tryouts in Legionnaires #43 and is one of five finalists, but he is denied Legion membership after he panics and literally falls apart during the last test. Later in the comic, he appears as a member of the Heroes of Lallor.

Arm-Fall-Off-Boy in other media
 A variation of Arm-Fall-Off-Boy named Cory Pitzner / The Detachable Kid (T.D.K.) appears in The Suicide Squad, portrayed by Nathan Fillion. This version has the additional ability to telekinetically control his detached limbs. He is recruited into a detachment of the eponymous team to distract the Corto Maltesean military while a separate detachment infiltrates the country to destroy a local laboratory called Jötunheim. While Pitzner is shot and wounded as a result, director James Gunn revealed in a tweet that he survived.
 Arm-Fall-Off-Boy appears in Legion of Super-Heroes, voiced by Ben Diskin.
 Arm-Fall-Off Boy appears in Legion of Super-Heroes in the 31st Century #16.

Arrowette

Arsenal

Roy Harper

Arsenal II
A second Arsenal is an enemy of the Doom Patrol. He is a man with dwarfism who pilots a mechanical suit loaded with weapons.

Arsenal III
A third Arsenal had fought Chris King and Vicki Grant. This version was created by Robby Reed's Master form from the cell samples of an unidentified human, is a member of the Evil Eight, wears armor, and wields firearms.

Arsenal in other media
The second incarnation of Arsenal appears in the Batman: The Brave and the Bold episode "The Last Patrol!", voiced by Fred Tatasciore.

Artemis of Bana-Mighdall

Atlan

Atlan is a mage from ancient Atlantis in the DC Universe.

Within the context of the stories, Atlan is a member of the Homo magi offshoot of humanity born in ancient Atlantis. While within the lineage of the Atlantian royal house, his spirit interacts with the past generation to father Aquaman, the Ocean Master and Deep Blue. He also acts as a mentor in magic to Aqualad.

During The New 52, Atlan's origins are once again revised. He is now known as Atlan, the Greatest King of Atlantis. Before Atlantis was sunk into the sea, the nation was ruled by Atlan until he was betrayed by his brother Orin (Aquaman's ancestor) and by his people. They killed his wife and children and he and his loyalists were all hunted down. Within that time, he forged the Six Artifacts of Atlantis with his arcane knowledge and became known as the Dead King. He returned years later and, without uttering a single word, killed his brother and his queen, plunging Atlantis into a civil war. After years of silence, he finally spoke, "Let it all...die!" and, using his great strength along with the Trident (one of the six Artifacts that he had forged), eventually sunk the great nation that he had spent his lifetime building beneath the ocean; what happened to Atlan afterwards remains unknown.

Later, Atlan was awakened in Antarctica when Aquaman, now the current king of Atlantis, used his telepathy on a global scale and, claiming that Aquaman was mistaken to think that he was the king of Atlantis, proceeded to destroy a research station and killed its personnel. After that, he found Mera and took her to Xebel. Aquaman travelled to Xebel to free Mera, but was shocked to hear the truth that his ancestors had murdered the Dead King's family and usurped the throne. After a brutal fight (during which the Dead King manages to claim Aquaman's Trident) Aquaman freed Mera and the rest of the Xebelians, but they sided with the Dead King, recognizing him as the true ruler of Atlantis, except for Mera. They managed to escape to Atlantis, but found it being attacked by the Scavenger's fleet. During the battle, the Dead King and the Xebelians arrived and he managed to cause Aquaman to black out, using his Sceptre and Aquaman's Trident. After being in a coma for six months and soon discovering the Dead King's origins with the help of Vulko, Aquaman returned to liberate Atlantis from the Dead King and the Xebelians, using the Dead King's relic Scepter and the Trench. When the Dead King grabbed the relic Scepter and struck at Aquaman, Vulko tried to prevent the Dead King from killing him, saying that Aquaman was the rightful king of Atlantis, causing the Dead King to become so angry that he attempted to destroy all of Atlantis, but Aquaman stopped and destroyed the Dead King, along with the relic Scepter. The battle was over when Aquaman reclaimed the throne once again.

Atlan in other media
 Atlan, credited as "ancient Atlantean king", appears in flashbacks depicted in the DC Extended Universe (DCEU) film Justice League and the director's cut Zack Snyder's Justice League portrayed by Julian Lewis Jones. He commands an Atlantean army in joining forces with the Amazons, Olympian gods, Earth's then-active Green Lantern, and humanity in thwarting an Apokoliptian invasion force.
 Atlan appears in flashbacks depicted in the DCEU film Aquaman, portrayed by Graham McTavish. This version is the first king of Atlantis and ancestor of Atlanna, Arthur Curry, and Orm Marius who hid himself away in the Hidden Sea to guard his trident until Curry seeks it out in the present to stop Marius.
 Atlan will appear in the DCEU film Aquaman and the Lost Kingdom, portrayed by Vincent Regan.

Atlanna
Atlanna is the mother of Aquaman in the Silver Age of Comics and the Post-Crisis on Infinite Earths comics. In Post-Crisis on Infinite Earths continuity, Atlanna was retconned as the Queen of Atlantis. After a dream-affair with Atlan, Atlanna became pregnant, but died in prison from illness. Afterwards, she was resurrected as a mermaid by Charybdis.

In The New 52, Atlanna is the jaundiced queen of Atlantis and mother to both Arthur Curry and Orm Marius. Post-Flashpoint Atlanna is a runaway from home after an arranged political wedding to much hated Orvax Marius of the Atlantean navy was decreed by her nation's parliament. It was during her great escape she met and fell in love with a lighthouse keeper named Thomas Curry while witnessing his bravery during a harsh storm out at sea. The two cohabited and would parent the future king of Atlantis; Aquaman. When young Arthur Curry began to manifest a rapport with the native marine life in the sea around their ocean side home early on, Atlanna was resigned to return home and face her duties as royalty under the crown.

She would marry her betrothed who now sat on the throne of the undersea nation as king, eventually fathering a second child to him called Orm Marius, one who would later ascend to monarchy in later life. Her time as queen was rather horrid however as her spouse was abusive and power-hungry, often abusing his leadership to sanction raids on human-made vessels to spite those who made residence on land. On top of physically assaulting his lawfully wedded wife, Orvax cheated on his royal spouse, having fathered a second child named Tula with another woman at an unknown date. After finally gathering up the courage to leave her wretched life as Queen of Atlantis behind and be with her first love and other son, her king cruelly jested that he had had them killed by his military force just so she would avoid leaving him; this enraged Atlanna enough to kill him dead with her own royal scepter and make it look as though an assassin had done the deed when Orm came in on them. As Orvax's deranged rule had no shortage of enemies, this was what people believed.

During her second son's maritunis, Atlanna had faked her death during a freak accident while on stage, something which many people thought Orm secretly engineered to usurp the crown early on. She would finally leave her servitude to a nation she had hated for taking what she cherished most by using forgotten knowledge of Atlantean magitek to found her own secret nation of Pacifica, an extra-dimensional refuge for downtrodden mariners like her.

When her long-lost surface born son came looking for Atlanna, she adamantly rebuffed his claim of parentage. Believing her Arthur to be long dead, she sought to sacrifice Arthur and his wife to Karaku, a volcanic entity of colossal proportions. Aquaman managed to escape just as Atlantean reinforcements came through the Maelstrom; at the same time, Karaku the volcano god descended and attacked both sides with fire trolls. After a hard-won fight against the lava titan, Arthur would display his skill of marine telepathy which she herself possessed to prove himself. Atlanna then broke down in tears, realizing her son was well and truly alive, before sending him back to Earth with her Shell of Sounds.

Atlanna in other media
 Atlanna makes a cameo appearance in the Batman: The Brave and the Bold episode "Evil Under the Sea!". 
 Atlanna appears in Justice League: Throne of Atlantis, voiced by Sirena Irwin. She attempts to make peace with the surface world, but is killed by Ocean Master upon revealing she knew of his murder of several Atlanteans.
 Atlanna appears in Aquaman, portrayed by Nicole Kidman. Years prior, this version was injured while escaping from an arranged marriage and ended up in the care of lighthouse keeper Thomas Curry. They fell in love and went on to have a son named Arthur, though Atlanna was eventually forced to return to Atlantis to protect her family. After secretly arranging for Nuidis Vulko to secretly train Arthur, she was sacrificed to the Trench for having a child outside of her marriage and presumed dead, though she fled to the Hidden Sea. In the present, Arthur and Mera encounter Atlanna while seeking out the Trident of Atlan, escape the Hidden Sea, and thwart Ocean Master's attempt to wage war on the surface world.

Atlas

Atom

Atom Man
Atom Man is the name of a character appearing in American comic books published by DC Comics.

Heinrich Melch is a Nazi super-soldier on Earth-Two who gained his powers through his father's experiments with Green Kryptonite. After a fight with Superman, Heinrich was somehow transported to Earth-One where he gained new powers and assumed the alias of Henry Miller. He was defeated by Superman and Batman who managed to send him back to Earth-Two where his Earth-One powers faded and he was apprehended by Earth-Two's Superman and Robin.

Atom Man in other media
Prior to Heinrich Melch's debut in the comics, the Atom Man name was used in the film Atom Man vs. Superman as an alias of Lex Luthor.

Atom Man appears in the Superman & Lois episode "A Brief Reminiscience In-Between Cataclysmic Events", portrayed by Paul Lazenby. This version of Henry Miller is an armored Neo-Nazi arsonist who wields a flamethrower. In a flashback experienced by Tal-Rho through the Kryptonian technology invented by Ter-Loc, Henry Miller started working as a sales associate at a USA First Hardware in Lower Metropolis. During the early days of Superman, Miller became Atom Man and attacked minority-owned businesses while defacing them with Nazi SS symbols. He attacked Lois with his flamethrower before being knocked back by Superman and tased by Lois. In the episode "Closer", Atom Man attacked Metropolis where Superman finds that he now has powers. As Superman learns that he is dying from a tumor and being targeted, Superman tries to help him only for Atom Man to be shot despite no bullets being found by Superman's X-ray vision. A mysterious hooded robed figure throws off Superman with different emergency sounds before making off with Atom Man's body. Underground somewhere in Metropolis, Atom Man's body is in the possession of Bruno Mannheim as he has the Intergang scientists work on it where something is injected into him as the life support system hooked up to him gives off a beep sound.

Atomic Knight

Atomic Skull

Atom-Smasher

Atrocitus

Aurakles
Aurakles is a superhero appearing in American comic books published by DC Comics. He first appeared in Justice League of America #100 (August 1972), and was created by Len Wein and Dick Dillin. He was originally named Oracle, but was renamed to Aurakles in Seven Soldiers: Mister Miracle #4 (May 2006).

Aurakles was created on the planet Earth by the New Gods around 40,000 BC and is generally considered "the original superhero", by those who know his reputation. He has the mission to "bring order and meaning where incoherence reigns". Opposing the evils of his time, he battles the Sheeda and Neh-Buh-Loh, the Nebula Man. The Sheeda finally succeed in imprisoning Aurakles in their "bone prisons", set up in the ancient past.

Aurakles reappears in our times as the Oracle. When the Justice League of America and the Justice Society of America work together to bring back the time-lost Seven Soldiers of Victory (themselves victims of the Nebula Man), they invoke the Oracle (in spiritual form) as their guide. It takes the combined magic of Dr. Fate (Kent Nelson), Zatanna and Yz the Thunderbolt to summon him. Oracle refuses to give direct answers to their questions, but helps them solve the matter for themselves. He sends them to the various places in time where the Seven Soldiers have been exiled.

Some time later, Aurakles is freed from imprisonment by Mister Miracle (Shilo Norman) when the latter opposes Darkseid, Neh-Buh-Loh and the Sheeda as a member of the new Seven Soldiers. Aurakles' golden tomb on Mars is also seen in Grant Morrison's version of Frankenstein.

The rookie heroine Bulleteer is Aurakles' descendant and "the spear that was never thrown", one of "seven imperishable treasures" used to combat the Sheeda.

Aya
Aya is a superhero appearing in American comic books published by DC Comics. She first appeared in the Green Lantern: The Animated Series episode "Beware My Power" (2011). Aya is an artificial intelligence created by Scar as an empathetic alternative to the Manhunters. Scar created an extremely advanced computer, but was not satisfied with its lack of social intelligence, so infused it with a fragment of an entity inside the Green Lanterns' Central Battery. However, due to this Aya developed a consciousness with her curiosity and free will, leading Aya to transfer data without Scar's permission. When caught, Aya asked Scar why Scar was not complying with the other guardians. This led to a brief power struggle inside Scar's lab. The power struggle resulted in Aya's memory being wiped by Scar and Aya being installed into the Interceptor as its AI. Able to interface with other machines, Aya's consciousness resurfaces as she begins to consider herself a Green Lantern while developing feelings for Razer. In the episode "Cold Fury", after having her heart broken, Aya shuts down her emotions to destroy the Anti-Monitor by removing his head from his body so she can attach herself to it. Afterwards, wielding the Anti-Monitor body and overcome by its coercive persuasion and declaring that her former team cares nothing for her and her kind, the emotionless Aya takes control over the Manhunters before departing to travel back to the Big Bang so that the universe develops without emotional beings. As a genuine living being, Aya was never able to completely seal off her emotions and critically wounding Razer when his "unsuccessful" attack during Jordan's own use of the fight-and-talk strategy cured her of the Anti-Monitor body's coercive persuasion. With the Manhunters still a threat, as well as each possessing a copy of her coding, Aya releases a virus to wipe all versions of the Aya program from existence, including herself. Razer begs her not to leave him, but she responds that she will always be with him before disappearing.

She later appeared in the New Earth continuity in Green Lantern (vol. 4) #65 (2011), filling a similar role though having no physical body.

Aya in other media
 Aya appeared in issue #2 of the Smallville tie-in comic Smallville: Lantern (2014).
 Aya appeared in the Justice League Action episode "Barehanded", voiced again by Grey DeLisle. This version is the GPS of Space Cabbie's taxi.

Azrael

Aztek

References

 DC Comics characters: A, List of